Serbia is a southeastern European country.

Serbia may also refer to:

In the Balkans
 Serbia proper, the central heartland of the Republic
 Principality of Serbia (early medieval) (8th-10th century)
 Grand Principality of Serbia (1101–1217)
 Kingdom of Serbia (medieval) (1217–1345)
 Serbian Empire (1346–71)
 Moravian Serbia (1371–1402)
 Serbian Despotate (1402–1537)
 Kingdom of Serbia (1718–39), crown land of the Habsburg Empire
 Revolutionary Serbia (1804–15)
 Principality of Serbia (1815–82)
 Voivodeship of Serbia and Banat of Temeschwar (1849–60)
 Kingdom of Serbia (1882–1918)
 Old Serbia, a geographical and historical region
 Austro-Hungarian occupation of Serbia, Habsburg-occupied Serbia (1915-1918)
 Territory of the Military Commander in Serbia (1941-1944), German-occupied territory of Serbia
 Socialist Republic of Serbia (1944–1992), a part of the Socialist Federal Republic of Yugoslavia
 Republic of Serbia (1992–2006), a part of the Federal Republic of Yugoslavia, later Serbia and Montenegro
 Serbia and Montenegro (2003–2006), Federation of Serbia and Montenegro
 Greater Serbia, ultra-nationalist expansionist concept
 Mother Serbia, national personification of Serbia

Elsewhere
 New Serbia (historical province), a region in Russia (now part of Ukraine), created in 1752
 Slavo-Serbia, a territory of Russia (now part of Ukraine) between 1753-64
 White Serbia, the proposed homeland of the Serbs, located in Sorbia, Germany

See also
 
 East Serbia (disambiguation)
 South Serbia (disambiguation)
 West Serbia (disambiguation)
 North Serbia (disambiguation)
 Serb Republic (disambiguation)
 Serbian (disambiguation)
 Serbians
 Srbija (disambiguation)
 Sorbia (disambiguation)